In information theory, Shannon–Fano–Elias coding is a precursor to arithmetic coding, in which probabilities are used to determine codewords.

Algorithm description 

Given a discrete random variable X of ordered values to be encoded, let  be the probability for any x in X.  Define a function 

Algorithm:
For each x in X,
Choose the length of the encoding of x, to be the integer 
Choose the encoding of x, be the first  most significant bits after the decimal point of Z.

Example 

Let X = {A, B, C, D}, with probabilities p = {1/3, 1/4, 1/6, 1/4}.
For A

In binary, Z(A) = 0.0010101010...

code(A) is 001

For B

In binary, Z(B) = 0.01110101010101...

code(B) is 011

For C

In binary, Z(C) = 0.101010101010...

code(C) is 1010

For D

In binary, Z(D) = 0.111

code(D) is 111

Algorithm analysis

Prefix code
Shannon–Fano–Elias coding produces a binary prefix code, allowing for direct decoding.

Let bcode(x) be the rational number formed by adding a decimal point before a binary code.  For example, if code(C) = 1010 then bcode(C) = 0.1010.  For all x, if no y exists such that 

then all the codes form a prefix code.

By comparing F to the CDF of X, this property may be demonstrated graphically for Shannon–Fano–Elias coding.

By definition of L it follows that 
 
And because the bits after L(y) are truncated from F(y) to form code(y), it follows that
 
thus bcode(y) must be no less than CDF(x).

Code length

The average code length is 
.
Thus for H(X), the entropy of the random variable X,

Shannon Fano Elias codes from 1 to 2 extra bits per symbol from X than entropy, so the code is not used in practice.

References

Lossless compression algorithms